Levi Sterling (January 2, 1804October 16, 1868) was an American farmer, politician, and Wisconsin pioneer.  He was one of the first American settlers at what is now Iowa County, Wisconsin.  He served five years in the Wisconsin Legislature and—before Wisconsin achieved statehood—he served three years in the Wisconsin Territorial Assembly.  During the American Civil War, he served as a Union Army cavalry officer.

Early life 

Levi Sterling was born in Woodford County, Kentucky, in January 1804.  He moved to Galena, Illinois, in March 1828 and, two months later, moved to the vicinity of what is now Mineral Point, Wisconsin—then part of the Michigan Territory.  In 1830, he was appointed deputy clerk of the United States District Court and for the county court of Iowa County.  During the Black Hawk War of 1832, he served as lieutenant in the volunteer militia company of Francis Gehon, in the army of Colonel Henry Dodge.

After the Black Hawk War 
After the war, he was appointed sheriff of Iowa County by Governor George Bryan Porter and was designated marshal for the United States District Court in Iowa and Crawford counties—at the time, this constituted roughly the western half of what is now the state of Wisconsin.  In 1834, he performed the first census of his district, which then contained 3,443 inhabitants—810 in Crawford and 2,633 in Iowa—not including Native Americans.

In 1836, Sterling served as sergeant-at-arms for the last session of the Legislative Council of the Michigan Territory (the "Rump Council"), and then served in the same role at the second session of the Council of the Wisconsin Territory.  He subsequently was elected transcribing clerk for the special session of the Assembly held in the Summer of 1838.

That Fall, he was elected as one of Iowa County's representatives in the Council (upper legislative chamber) of the Wisconsin Territory and served through all of the 2nd Wisconsin Territorial Assembly and the first session of the 3rd Wisconsin Territorial Assembly.  He resigned in 1841 after being appointed receiver of public moneys in the Mineral Point land district.

He was elected sheriff of Iowa County in 1846 and re-elected in 1848.  He was elected to the Wisconsin State Senate in 1850 for the 5th State Senate district—then comprising just Iowa County.  After redistricting in 1852, he was elected to another term in the Senate for the 15th State Senate district—then comprising Iowa and Richland counties.  While serving in the Senate, he was also appointed deputy surveyor of U.S. lands in Iowa and Wisconsin. In 1854, he was elected to another two-year term as sheriff.  In 1857, Governor Coles Bashford appointed him as one of the three commissioners to locate and build a State Hospital for the Insane.  He was subsequently elected to a final term in the Legislature, serving in the Wisconsin State Assembly in 1858.  In politics, Sterling was a member of the Whig Party until the creation of the Republican Party in 1854.

Civil War and aftermath 
At the outbreak of the American Civil War, Sterling received a commission to raise a company of volunteers from the Mineral Point area for the 2nd Wisconsin Cavalry Regiment. When the regiment was organized in the Fall of 1861, he was mustered into service as major for the 2nd battalion of the regiment, under Colonel Cadwallader C. Washburn.  The 2nd Wisconsin Cavalry served in the western theater of the war.  After a year, he was promoted to lieutenant colonel of the regiment, and served in that capacity for another year, resigning in June 1863.

Sterling died of inflammation of the lungs and pleurisy at his home near Mineral Point in October 1868.  He was survived by three daughters and one son.

References

External links
 

1804 births
1868 deaths
People from Woodford County, Kentucky
People from Mineral Point, Wisconsin
American people of the Black Hawk War
People of Wisconsin in the American Civil War
Members of the Wisconsin Territorial Legislature
Wisconsin state senators
19th-century American politicians
Wisconsin sheriffs
Union Army officers
Wisconsin Republicans
Wisconsin Whigs